Yu Jae-seong (born 20 February 1960) is a South Korean long-distance runner. He competed in the men's marathon at the 1988 Summer Olympics.

References

1960 births
Living people
Athletes (track and field) at the 1988 Summer Olympics
South Korean male long-distance runners
South Korean male marathon runners
Olympic athletes of South Korea
Place of birth missing (living people)
Asian Games medalists in athletics (track and field)
Asian Games bronze medalists for South Korea
Athletes (track and field) at the 1986 Asian Games
Medalists at the 1986 Asian Games
20th-century South Korean people